Roberta Frances "Bobbi" Fiedler (née Horowitz; April 22, 1937 – March 3, 2019) was an American politician who served as a Republican U.S. Representative from California.

Early life and education
Born Roberta Frances Horowitz in Santa Monica, California on April 22, 1937, Fiedler attended area public schools. Studies continued at Santa Monica Technical School (1955–1957) and Santa Monica City College (1955–1959).

Career 
Fiedler began her political career at Encino's Lanai Road Elementary School, where she mobilized other mothers to protest court-ordered desegregation busing. Fiedler formed an organization called Bustop in 1976, and the organization grew to 30,000 members in weeks. Fiedler's role in the grass-roots group helped propel her to public office, as she won a surprising upset in 1977 against Los Angeles school board president Robert Docter, who favored desegregation busing. While serving on the Los Angeles (City) Board of Education, Fiedler and fellow board member Roberta Weintraub were fierce opponents of desegregation busing.

Career
In 1980, Fiedler ran as a Republican for Congress against Democrat James C. Corman, who had served 20 years in Congress and was the chairman of the Democratic Congressional Campaign Committee. Fiedler was an underdog, running against Corman in a district that was 62% Democratic, and with the incumbent next in line to be chairman of the United States House Committee on Ways and Means. The National Republican Congressional Committee targeted Corman, hoping not to defeat him, but to embarrass him. Desegregation busing was the central issue in the election between Fiedler and Corman with some children being forced to ride a bus up to 50 miles away from home. Time reported on the campaign as follows: "Again the issue is local: busing that was ordered by the Supreme Court of California in 1977 to desegregate public schools in Los Angeles County.

Corman's campaign manager, Clint Reilly, later recalled that his candidate's position on racial integration drew heavy fire from Fiedler, whom he described as "the leader of LA's anti-busing movement." Reilly noted that the Republican Party raised more than a million dollars for Fiedler, and "the campaign was waged in the racially charged atmosphere of the San Fernando Valley." After a fierce campaign in which Corman was often picketed by anti-busing activists, the candidates entered election day in a dead heat in the polls, and Corman lost to Fiedler by 750 votes out of 200,000 cast. Jimmy Carter publicly conceded the election to Ronald Reagan while the polls were still open in California. There were anecdotal reports of disgruntled Democrats leaving election day lines and going home rather than voting, thus potentially costing Corman the election.

Fiedler was one of several Jewish women who have been elected to Congress from California; she was followed in 1982 by Barbara Boxer and in 1992 by Jane Harman. (The first woman elected from California was Florence Prag Kahn of San Francisco in 1924.) Fiedler considered herself an independent Republican, breaking with her party over her support for abortion rights and the Equal Rights Amendment.

After her narrow victory in 1980, Fiedler was re-elected in 1982, defeating Democrat George Henry Margolis 71.8% to 24.1%. She won in another landslide in 1984, defeating Charlie Davis 72.3% to 25.9%.

U.S. Senate campaign
In 1986, Fiedler did not run for re-election to the House of Representatives, opting instead to make what proved to be an unsuccessful bid for the Republican nomination to challenge three-term Democratic incumbent Alan Cranston for his United States Senate seat.

She was charged with political corruption in January 1986 after an undercover investigation allegedly showed that Fiedler offered $100,000 to a rival, State Senator Ed Davis (R), if he would withdraw from the Republican senatorial primary. The charges were dismissed by Judge Robert Altman before the matter went to trial. Despite the dismissal of the charges in February 1986, Fiedler garnered only 7.2% of the vote in the Republican primary.

Death 
Fiedler died in Northridge, Los Angeles on March 3, 2019.

See also
List of Jewish members of the United States Congress
Women in the United States House of Representatives

References

External links
 Official Congressional Biography
 

1937 births
2019 deaths
Female members of the United States House of Representatives
Jewish members of the United States House of Representatives
People from Northridge, Los Angeles
People from Santa Monica, California
Santa Monica College alumni
School board members in California
Women in California politics
Republican Party members of the United States House of Representatives from California
Candidates in the 1986 United States elections
Jewish women politicians
20th-century American politicians
20th-century American women politicians
21st-century American Jews
21st-century American women